Harvey III of Léon (c. 1219 – c. 1265) was Viscount of Léon. He succeeded his father Guihomar VI.

Life 
To repay his debts to Duke John I, Harvey III sold him the castle and port of Brest in March 1240 in Quimperlé, which allowed the Duke to have a bearing in the north-west of the Duchy. The castellum (castle) of Quimperlé was burnt down in 1241 by one of Harvey III's distant relatives, also named Harvey of Léon, who had rebelled against the Duke.

Harvey III died at an unknown date after May 1265.

Issue 
Harvey had married a woman named Margilie. They had four children:
 Harvey IV who succeeded his father
 Alan, who died without issue 
 Anné, who married Roland II, Lord of Dinan a knight, Lord of Montafilant and Runefau
 Constance married Guillaume of Plœuc

References

Sources 
 Patrick Kernévez, André-Yves Bourgès Généalogie des vicomtes de Léon (XIe, XIIe et XIIIe siècles). Bulletin de la Société archéologique du Finistère, volume CXXXVI, 2007, p. 157-188.

Viscounts of Léon
House of Léon